The Audi S8 is a full-size luxury car of the Audi S models produced by the German automaker Audi AG, manufactured by Audi Sport GmbH at the Neckarsulm plant. The S8 is the mechanically-upgraded, high-performance version of the Audi A8, fitted standard with Audi's quattro all-wheel drive system, and was only offered with a short-wheelbase for the first three generations, being joined by a long-wheelbase variant option for the fourth generation.

(D2) First generation 

Audi S8 (D2) was produced from 1996 to 2003. The D2 S8 could accelerate from 0– in 6.2 seconds. An Audi S8 (D2) was chosen as the car of the protagonists of the film Ronin.

(D3) Second generation 

Audi S8 (D3) was released from 2006 to 2010. The car was equipped with a modified V10 engine shared with the Lamborghini Gallardo of the same years. Acceleration from 0– takes 5.1 seconds.

(D4) Third generation 

Audi S8 (D4) (2012–2015, facelift 2015–2018) 3,993 V8 TFSI. It produces .

Unlike the regular S8 which was built by Audi on the regular assembly line alongside other A8 variants, the S8 Plus was built by Audi Sport (formerly Quattro GmbH) and has a VIN that starts with WUA to identify it.

(D5) Fourth generation 

The release of the fourth generation S8 is planned to begin in 2019–2020. For the first time, it will be offered in both short and long-wheelbase versions, with the long-wheelbase S8 (i.e., an S8L) being the sole variant offered in North America. The S8 is now the flagship of the Audi A8 range, since the nominally higher-end A8 L W12 was no longer offered after the 2018 model year.

A 48-volt mild hybrid system will allow for stop-start use and coasting. Compared to the S8 plus (D4), the S8 (D5) has  less but  more torque.

See also

Audi Sport GmbH
Audi S and RS models
Audi A8
Audi S4
Audi RS4
Audi RS6

References

External links
Autobild.de Audi S8

S8
Cars introduced in 1996
2000s cars
2010s cars
All-wheel-drive vehicles
Executive cars
Euro NCAP executive cars
Full-size vehicles
Sports sedans